The 2009/10 Elite One Championship season saw the league reduced to 9 teams with each team playing home and away with the top 5 going on to contest the play-offs. The season ran from October to May with Lézignan Sangliers eventually coming out on top after beating Pia XIII in the final which was played in Montpellier. This victory completed a league and cup double coming just a month after they had beaten Limoux Grizzlies in the Lord Derby Cup final 18-14 in Avignon.

Table 

Points win=3: draw=2: loss=1

Play-offs 
Week 1
 Elimination Quarter-Final - Pia XIII 25-24 Saint-Esteve XIII Catalan
 Qualifying Final - AS Carcassonne 31-10 Limoux Grizzlies
Week 2
 Elimination Semi-Final - Limoux Grizzlies 20-38 Pia XIII
 Major Semi-Final - Lézignan Sangliers 54-12 AS Carcassonne
Week 3
 Elimination Final - AS Carcassonne 16-17 Pia XIII

Grand Final

See also 

 Rugby league in France
 French Rugby League Championship
 Elite One Championship

References

External links 

 French rugby league website

Rugby league competitions in France
2009 in French rugby league
2010 in French rugby league